The National Water Supply and Drainage Board (commonly abbreviated as NWSDB) is the National Organization responsible for the provision of safe drinking water and facilitating the provision of sanitation to the people in Sri Lanka.  The organization had its beginning as a sub department under the Public Works Department for water supply and drainage. In 1965, it became a division under the Ministry of Local Government. From 1970, this division functioned as a separate department under the Ministry of Irrigation, Power and Highways and remained so until the present board was established in January 1975 by an act of Parliament of Sri Lanka.

The main functions of the National Water Supply & Drainage Board (NWSDB), which presently functions under the Ministry of Water Supply & Drainage are operation and maintenance of water supply and sewerage schemes, implementation of new urban and rural water supply projects, carrying out sector planning, feasibility studies, detailed designs, tender documentation, contract administration, project supervision and research and development work in the water and sanitation sector.

Regional Support Centers (RSC's)
National Water Supply and Drainage Board consists of 12 regional support centres based on 9 provinces of Sri Lanka.
Western Central
Western North
Western South
Western Production
Central
Southern
North Central
Northern
North Western
Sabaragamuwa
Uva
Eastern

See also 
 Biyagama Water Treatment Plant

External links 
 

Public utilities of Sri Lanka
State owned commercial corporations of Sri Lanka
Water supply and sanitation in Sri Lanka
1975 establishments in Sri Lanka